Orr Parish is a remote rural locality and civil parish of Evelyn County, New South Wales.
The landscape of the Parish is flat arid semi-desert of the Channel Country and the population is less than 1 person per 134.63km². The parish has a Köppen climate classification of BWh (Hot desert).

References

Populated places in New South Wales